Jesse Levine and Michael Shabaz were the defending champions, but both players were no longer eligible to compete in the juniors.

Kellen Damico and Nathaniel Schnugg defeated Martin Kližan and Andrej Martin in the final, 7–6(9–7), 6–2 to win the boys' doubles tennis title at the 2006 Wimbledon Championships.

Seeds

  Thiemo de Bakker /  Alexandre Sidorenko (first round)
  Martin Kližan /  Andrej Martin (final)
  Luka Belić /  Antonio Veić (quarterfinals)
  Jeevan Nedunchezhiyan /  Sanam Singh (first round)
  Sho Aida /  Artur Chernov (first round)
  Roman Jebavý /  Hans Podlipnik-Castillo (first round)
  Philip Bester /  Robin Roshardt (first round)
  Jaak Põldma /  Ivan Sergeyev (first round)

Draw

Finals

Top half

Bottom half

References

External links

Boys' Doubles
Wimbledon Championship by year – Boys' doubles